Michael, Mick, or Mike Murphy may refer to:

Artists and entertainers
 Michael Murphy (actor) (born 1938), American actor
 Mike Murphy (musician) (1946–2006), American drummer for the Bee Gees and Chicago
 Michael Bryan Murphy, lead singer of REO Speedwagon
 Michael John Murphy, American folk musician
 Mike L. Murphy (born 1975), American film maker and animator
 Michael Murphy (singer) (born 1986), New Zealand Idol runner up
 Mic Murphy (born 1958), member of musical duo The System
 Michael Murphy (sculptor) (born 1975), American artist
 Mick Murphy (guitarist) (born 1972), American guitarist and multi-instrumentalist

Sportspeople

Association football
 Mick Murphy (footballer) (born 1976), English former football midfielder
 Mike Murphy (footballer) (born 1939), English former football goalkeeper

Gaelic football
 Michael Murphy (Gaelic footballer) (born 1989), Donegal and Glenswilly sportsman
 Mick Murphy (Gaelic footballer) (1931–2009), Irish Gaelic footballer

Gridiron football
 Mike Murphy (American football) (born 1944), American football coach
 Mike Murphy (Canadian football), Canadian Football League fullback
 Mike Murphy (trainer and coach) (1860–1913), trainer of boxing champion John L. Sullivan, first Michigan Wolverines football coach, and the "father of American track athletics"

Hurling
 Mick Murphy (Limerick hurler) (1897–1955), Irish hurler who played as a goalkeeper for the Limerick senior team
 Michael Murphy (Templederry hurler) (born 1959), Irish hurler
 Mick Murphy (Tipperary hurler) (1940–2018), Irish sportsperson
 Mick Murphy (hurler, born 1918) (1918–2018), Irish hurler with Tipperary and Clare
 Mick Murphy (Cork hurler) (1894–1968), Irish sportsman and revolutionary figure

Other sports
 Michael Murphy (Australian footballer) (born 1965), VFL/AFL player
 Mick Murphy (rugby league) (1941–2019), rugby union and rugby league footballer of the 1960s and 1970s
 Mike Murphy (baseball) (1888–1952), American Major League Baseball catcher
 Michael Murphy (cricketer) (1854–1890), Australian cricketer
 Mick Murphy (cyclist) (1934–2015), Irish cyclist, wrestler and boxer
 Michael Murphy (diver) (born 1973), Australian Olympic diver
 Mike Murphy (ice hockey, born 1950), ice hockey player and head coach, currently NHL vice-president of hockey operations
 Mike Murphy (ice hockey, born 1989), Canadian ice hockey goaltender
 Mike Murphy (trainer and coach) (1860–1913), trainer of boxing champion John L. Sullivan, first Michigan Wolverines football coach, and the "father of American track athletics"
 Michael Murphy, head women's basketball coach for Troy University

Politicians
 Michael Murphy (Indiana politician) (born 1957), member of the Indiana House of Representatives
 Michael Pat Murphy (1919–2000), Irish Labour Party politician
 Michael Murphy (Tennessee politician), member of the Tennessee House of Representatives (1971–1986)
 Michael C. Murphy (New York politician) (1839–1903), New York politician and Medal of Honor recipient
 Michael C. Murphy (Michigan politician) (1952–2014), member of the Michigan House of Representatives
 Mick Murphy (Irish Socialist politician)
 Mick Murphy (Sinn Féin politician) (born 1942), nationalist politician in Northern Ireland
 Mike Murphy (New Brunswick politician) (born 1958), Canadian lawyer and Liberal politician
 Mike Murphy (political consultant) (born 1962), American Republican political consultant
 Mike Murphy (Washington politician), treasurer of the state of Washington
 Michael Murphy (Kansas politician), member of the Kansas House of Representatives

Soldiers
 Michael Murphy (VC) (c. 1837–1893), Irish recipient of the Victoria Cross
 Michael D. Murphy, U.S. Air Force colonel charged with falsely claiming to be an attorney
 Michael P. Murphy (1976–2005), U.S. Navy SEAL and Medal of Honor recipient, killed in the War in Afghanistan

Characters
 Michael Murphy, fictional character in the TV series The Leftovers
 Michael Murphy, main protagonist of Babylon Rising

Others
 Michael Murphy (author) (born 1930), American Integral Movement author and co-founder of the Esalen Institute
 Michael Murphy (priest) (c. 1767–1798), co-leader of the Irish Rebellion of 1798
 Michael Murphy (bishop), 20th-century Irish Roman Catholic bishop
 Michael Derrington Murphy (born 1940), chemistry professor and bluegrass musician
 Michael J. Murphy (police commissioner) (1913–1997), American police commissioner
 Michael Joseph Murphy (1915–2007), American prelate of the Roman Catholic Church
 Michael R. Murphy (born 1947), American judge
 Michael Murphy (academic), former President of University College Cork
 Michael Murphy (New Zealand magistrate) (1806–1852), New Zealander clerk, police magistrate, and subsheriff
 Michael Murphy (journalist) (born 1948/49), news reader with RTÉ
 Mike Murphy (born 1941), Irish broadcaster
 Mike Murphy (sports radio personality) (born 1951), nicknamed "Murph", American radio talk-show host
 Michael Murphy (pilot) (1816–1887), 19th-century American New York Sandy Hook maritime pilot
 Michael J. Murphy (builder) (1885–1959), master builder in the Carmel-by-the-Sea, California
 Michael J. Murphy (diplomat), American diplomat
 USS Michael Murphy, a destroyer

See also
 Michael Martin Murphey (born 1945), American singer and songwriter